Two Faces of My Girlfriend is a 2007 South Korean romantic comedy film starring Bong Tae-gyu and Jung Ryeo-won.

This was Jung's first big-screen leading role, for which she won Best New Actress at the 28th Blue Dragon Film Awards in 2007 and at the 4th Premiere Asia Rising Star Awards in 2008.

Plot
Naive and awkward Gu-chang is on his seventh year of college, constantly failing job interviews and living off of an allowance from his divorced sister. The almost 30-year-old virgin has never had a girlfriend, or even kissed a girl before. One day, he picks up a wallet at a dining hall and meets its owner: sweet, innocent and bashful Ani. He falls in love with her instantly and the two begin dating. But just when everything seems to be going well, he discovers another side to Ani: she becomes overly aggressive, drinks too much and cusses loudly. He learns that his girlfriend has multiple personality disorder, and that wild and violent Hani is one of her two personalities.

Cast

Bong Tae-gyu as Gu-chang 
Jung Ryeo-won as Ani/Hani/Yu-ri
Lee Hye-eun as Young-sun
Shin Eun-jung as Sang-hee
Kim In-kwon as Gu-chang's seonbae
Jin Tae-hyun as Shi-hoo
Kim Tae-su as Gu-chang's hubae
Kim Gyeong-rae as Gu-chang's hubae
Jang Ji-woong as Gu-chang's hubae
Sa-hee as Shi-hoo's girlfriend
Jo Dal-hwan as Bum 
Lee Su-na as Tteok ajumma
Go Tae-ho as Dong-gu
Ham Sung-min as Young boy
Im Hyung-kook as Gu-chang's senior colleague at work
Lee Young-ah as Glamor girl
Kim Hye-ok as Gu-chang's mother

Box office
The film was released on September 12, 2007. It attracted 762,112 admissions, earning  at the box office.

Remake
A Chinese remake titled Goodbye Ani starring Im Yoona is slated for 2015.

References

External links
 

South Korean romantic comedy films
2007 films
Showbox films
Films directed by Lee Seok-hoon
2007 romantic comedy films
Films about dissociative identity disorder
2000s Korean-language films
2000s South Korean films